Schrankia daviesi is a species of moth of the family Erebidae first described by Jeremy Daniel Holloway in 1977. It is found on Norfolk Island between Australia, New Zealand and New Caledonia.

References

Moths described in 1977
Hypenodinae